= Abouadeineita =

Town of ancient Phrygia

Coordinates: 39°31′44″N 30°32′32″E

Abouadeineita was a town of ancient Phrygia, inhabited during Roman and Byzantine times. Its name does not occur in ancient authors, but is inferred from epigraphic and other evidence.

Its site is tentatively located near Musalar Köyü in Asiatic Turkey.
